Elections to Newcastle-under-Lyme Borough Council were held on 4 May 2006.  One third of the council was up for election and the Labour Party lost overall control of the council to no overall control.

After the election, the composition of the council was:
Labour 27
Conservative 17
Liberal Democrat 14
United Kingdom Independence Party 1
Independent 1.

Election result

Ward results

References
2006 Newcastle-under-Lyme election result

2006
2006 English local elections
2000s in Staffordshire